Green electricity in Australia is available from a number of utilities that supply electricity from environmentally friendly energy sources that are renewable and non-polluting. In Australia green energy is accredited under the GreenPower scheme whereby all distributors are government audited bi-annually to ensure that customers are getting exactly what is described in their purchased products. The growth and development of the green energy industry was tracked in Australia by the ALTEX-Australia alternative energy index from 2006 to 2011.

Market share 
In the 2009 settlement period there were 904,716 GreenPower customers Australia-wide, accounting for a total of 2,194,934 MWh of electricity generation, a 10% increase over 2008. This total electricity provision was divided between  residential customers who purchased 1,001,195 MWh, and business customers who purchased 1,193,739 MWh. By the 2014 settlement period the number of GreenPower customers Australia-wide was at 497,406, and total purchases accounted for 1,279,281 MWh.

Companies offering GreenPower
The largest nationwide distributors were EnergyAustralia, Origin Energy, and TRUenergy.
As of 2008 these companies offered a residential GreenPower accredited program:
 AGL
 ARK Climate
 Australian Power & Gas
 Click Energy
 Climate Friendly
 Essential Energy
 COzero
 Domayne
 EnergyAustralia
 Ergon Energy Queensland
 Global Green Plan
 Integral Energy
 Jackgreen
 Lumo Energy
 Momentum Energy
 Origin Energy
 Our Neighbourhood Energy
 Powershop
 Queensland Electricity
 Simply Energy
 South Australia Electricity
 Synergy (electricity corporation)
 TRUenergy
 Victoria Electricity

See also

 Sustainable energy
 Renewable energy commercialisation in Australia
 Renewable energy in Australia

References

External links
 GreenPower.gov.au - accredited renewable energy
 Switchwise green suppliers
 Estimates of additional cost of new renewable energy
 Households switch on to green power
 What is GreenPower and how does it work
 Why does Green Power cost extra?

Electric power in Australia
Renewable energy in Australia